Suehiro (末広) is a Japanese term and can refer to:

Surname 
, Japanese video game designer

Given name 
A masculine name, notable people with the name include:
, Japanese long-distance runner
, Japanese manga artist
, Japanese translator, critic and essayist

Places 
 Suehiro Canal, canal in the city of Kawasaki, Kanagawa Prefecture
 Suehiro-chō, district of Miyako (Iwate)
 Suehiro-chō, Nagoya, district of Nagoya
 Suehiro-za (Nagoya), a kabuki theatre 

 Suehiro (Yūbari), station on the Yūbari railroad line 
Suehiro Station, a railway station in Akita Prefecture, Japan

See also
 Suehiro Shōkai, Japanese company
 Suehiro-tei, Japanese Yose theatre

Japanese-language surnames
Japanese masculine given names

de:Suehiro
ja:末広